Henry Edwards may refer to:

Henry W. Edwards (1779–1847), U.S. Representative, U.S. Senator, and Governor of Connecticut
Sir Henry Edwards, 1st Baronet (1812–1886), British Conservative MP for Halifax, 1847–1852, and Beverley, 1857–1870
Sir Henry Edwards (1820–1897), British Liberal MP for Weymouth and Melcombe Regis, 1867–1885
Henry Sutherland Edwards (1828–1906), British journalist
Henry Edwards (entomologist) (1827–1891), English-born actor, writer and insect scientist
Henry Edwards (priest) (1837–1884), Welsh Anglican Dean of Bangor
Henry Edwards (footballer) (1856–1913), Wrexham F.C. and Wales international footballer
Henry Edwards (actor) (1882–1952), English actor and film director
Henry Edwards (cricketer) (1861–1921), English cricketer
F. Henry Edwards (1897–1991), British leader in the Reorganized Church of Jesus Christ of Latter Day Saints

See also
Harry Edwards (disambiguation)